House by the Railroad is a 1925 oil on canvas painting by Edward Hopper.

Background
The house that is said to have inspired the painting is a Second Empire style Victorian mansion in Haverstraw, New York, where it still stands today.  The painting is reported to have influenced the Bates home  in Alfred Hitchcock's Psycho, one of the homes in the 1956 film Giant directed by George Stevens, the home Charles Addams created for The Addams Family, and the house in Days of Heaven.

In 1929–30 House the canvas was included in Paintings by 19 Living Americans The Museum of Modern Art’s initial show solely of American art. It was acquired by MoMA in 1930, one of the inaugural pieces to become part of the then new  art institution's holdings.  The work was donated to the MoMA by the Singer sewing machine company heir, art collector, and philanthropist Stephen Clark.

References

1925 paintings
Paintings by Edward Hopper